Ellame En Pondattithaan is a 1998 Tamil-language comedy film directed by V. Sekhar and produced by A. M. Rathnam. The film stars Ramki and Sanghavi, with Manivannan, Raadhika, Vadivelu and Charle in pivotal roles. It was released on 5 September 1998.

Plot
Ramki moves to the city to stay at his aunty Radhika's house. Radhika is married to Manivannan, a politician, who forces Radhika to nominate herself for the regional MLA position. Radhika initially refuses the chance but later gets convinced by her nephew to stand in the elections. She later becomes a MLA and wants to help and serve the people. On the other hand, her husband wants to take bribes, misuse power and become rich.

Cast
Ramki
Sanghavi
Manivannan
Raadhika
Vadivelu
Vennira Aadai Moorthy
Kovai Sarala
Charle
Kumarimuthu
Thyagu
Vichithra
Suryakanth

Soundtrack

The film score and the soundtrack were composed by Deva. The soundtrack, released in 1998, features 5 tracks with lyrics written by Vaali.

Release
A critic from the Deccan Herald wrote "there is not any story to speak of, and everything in this film is silly" and "it’s impossible to sit through a film like this without wondering who such films are made for."

References

1998 films
Indian political comedy-drama films
Indian political satire films
Films scored by Deva (composer)
1990s Tamil-language films
Films directed by V. Sekhar
1990s political comedy-drama films
1990s political satire films